Concrete Rose is the fourth studio album by American singer Ashanti, released on December 14, 2004, by The Inc. Records and Def Jam Recordings. In addition to working with frequent collaborators Irv Gotti, Chink Santana, and 7 Aurelius, Ashanti also enlisted new collaborators Malcolm Flythe, Jimi Kendrix, and Demi-Doc, to assist. The album features guest appearances from rappers T.I., Ja Rule, and Lloyd.

Concrete Rose was preceded by lead single "Only U", which received positive reviews and reached the top-twenty in several countries. The album debuted at number seven on the Billboard 200 in the United States, with first-week sales of 254,000 units; the album also became Ashanti's third consecutive album to top the Top R&B/Hip-Hop Albums. Outside the United States, the album was less successful, with its strongest ranking being in the top thirty of the UK Albums Chart. Critical reception to the project was mixed, with most deeming the album unoriginal. Nonetheless, the album did receive a platinum certification from the Recording Industry Association of America (RIAA), and gained gold status in Japan and the United Kingdom.

The album and its promotion was vastly overshadowed by the legal troubles that faced The Inc. and Gotti, who was arrested on money laundering charges only a month after Concrete Roses release. As a result, Def Jam severed ties with The Inc. in May 2005, and refused to promote the album's second single "Don't Let Them", which only charted moderately in Ireland and the United Kingdom.

Background 
Following the success of her sophomore studio album Chapter II, Ashanti confirmed in November 2003 that she had begun planning her third studio album, due to be out in mid-2004. In February 2004, Ashanti said the album had "a new sound, a new flavor", and said she wanted "to touch on more topics that I didn't touch on with the first and the second record." She also confirmed that she had already recorded three songs for the album. By July, Ashanti confirmed she had already finished the record, and planned its release for November.

Singles and promotion 
The song "Turn It Up", featuring rapper Ja Rule, was initially released as the lead single off the album. However, it was downscaled to a buzz single after The Inc. decided to release "Only U" as Concrete Roses lead single instead. The song, released on October 26, 2004, reached the top ten of several countries, including Ireland (#4), Japan (#), and the United Kingdom (#2); the song also reached the top twenty in Germany (#12), New Zealand (#14), Switzerland (#12), and the United States (#13).

The album was largely overshadowed by the legal issues surrounding Murder Inc./The Inc. and its head, Irv Gotti. In January 2003, during recording of Chapter II, the offices Murder Inc. were raided during an investigation into Gotti's ties to gangster Kenneth McGriff. In November, Murder Inc. changed its name to The Inc., in an attempt to distance the company from its several controversies. Between November 2004 and January 2005, Gotti, McGriff, and several employees and associates of The Inc. were arrested on charges of money laundering, racketeering, and murder, regarding to the killing of rapper E-Money Bags. In April 2005, Ashanti chose "Don't Let Them" to be the second single from the album. However, in May, Def Jam dissolved its partnership with The Inc., and refused to promote the single or give it a music video. As a result, the single failed to chart in the United States; however, the single did chart moderately in Ireland (#41) and the United Kingdom (#38).

Critical reception 

Concrete Rose received mixed reviews from music critics. At Metacritic, which assigns a normalized rating out of 100 to reviews from mainstream critics, the album received an average score of 47, based on 10 reviews, which indicates "mixed or average" reviews. Andy Kellman from Allmusic found that "disregarding the ill-suited standards, an Ashanti album is always good for a handful of strong singles, as Concrete Rose helps indicate [...] it's no better or worse than her 2002 debut or 2003's Chapter II, with the standout singles, decent album cuts, and filler fluff provided in equal doses." USA Today journalist Steve Jones found that with Concrete Rose Ashanti "sticks closely to her usual formula of engaging beats and airy vocals [...] Still, she is consistent enough to make this Rose bloom full time." Nicholas Tayor from PopMatters called the album "a decent, 54-minute collection of mostly mid-tempo tracks by a decent R&B singer." Billboard noted that "a more confident-sounding Ashanti is onboard for her third time out. Powered by sensual lead single "Only You," Concrete Rose contains several other equally rhythmic jams."

Hattie Collins, writing for The Guardian, found that "Ashanti doesn't stray from the R&B rulebook that has so far seen her sell some 7m albums in the US alone – namely a hip-hop backdrop of hard-knock beats tempered by a soul-lite vocal [...] A lack of originality and too much filler mark Ashanti more as a pedestrian than the princess she purports to be." Steve Appleford from the Los Angeles Times wrote that Ashanti and Concrete Rose sound "trapped, sapped of strength and ideas, and buried beneath all the worst cold and calculated production tendencies of her label [...] What follows is modern R&B; formula at its most flat and uninspired. For all her lovesick panting, pleading and purring, Ashanti is never emotionally engaged with the songs, which aren't worth the trouble anyway." Entertainment Weeklys Raymond Fiore remarked that "the thin-voiced vixen's third disc bruises both genres with a slew of mostly midtempo clunkers built with her weapons of choice: faux grit and forced sensuality." In his review for Slant Magazine, Sal Cinquemani wrote: "Ashanti is incapable of doing slinky or sexy and, despite her incessant attempts at vamping, she can't all-out sing either – she's even upstaged by a Hammond organ."

Chart performance 
During the week of Christmas, Concrete Rose debuted at number seven on the Billboard 200 album chart with first-week sales of 254,000 units sold. In total, it remained on the Billboard 200 albums chart for 20 consecutive weeks. On the Top R&B/Hip Hop Albums chart the album debuted at number two where it spent a total of 28 consecutive weeks on the chart. On January 14, 2005, the album was certified Platinum by the Recording Industry Association of America (RIAA) for one million shipped units.

Outside the United States the album debuted or peaked at #25 in the United Kingdom, #98 in France, #35 in Germany and #66 in Switzerland.

Track listing

Samples 
 "Message to the Fans (Skit)" [which serves as the intro to "Only U"]  contains a sample of "Why You Treat Me So Bad" by Club Nouveau, written by Denzil Foster, Jay King, Jocelyn McElroy, and Thomas McElroy.
 "Don't Let Them" contains a sample of "Heaven & Hell" by Raekwon featuring Ghostface Killah, written by Dennis Coles and Corey Woods, which itself samples "Could I Be Falling In Love" by Syl Johnson, written by Willie Mitchell, Yvonne Mitchell, Earl Randle, and Lawrence Seymour.
 "Love Again" contains a sample of "Fuck Faces" by Scarface featuring Too Short, Tela, & Devin the Dude, and written by Devin Copeland, Mike Dean, Brad Jordan, Winston Rogers, and Todd Shaw.
 "U" contains an interpolation of "Freek'n You (Mr. Dalvin's Freek Remix)" by Jodeci featuring Raekwon and Ghostface Killah, written by Donald DeGrate.
 "Turn It Up" contains a sample of "Short Eyes", written and performed by Curtis Mayfield.

Personnel 

 7 Aurelius – vocals, background vocals, producer, associate executive producer, instrumentation
 Won "Engineer to the Stars" Bee Allen – engineer
 Chuck Amos – hair stylist
 David Ashton – engineer
 Ashaunna Ayars – marketing
 Jerry Barnes – bass guitar
 William Barnes – guitar
 Erica Bowen – recording director
 Milwaukee "Protools King" Buck – engineer
 Al "Boogie" Carty – bass
 Robin Clark – executive assistant
 Tom Coyne – mastering
 Kenneth Crouch – keyboards
 Ashanti Douglas – executive producer
 Tinya Y. Douglas – management
 Tony Duran – photography
 Easy Mo Bee – drum programming, beats
 Malcolm Flythe – producer
 Stephen George – mixing
 Irv Gotti – producer, executive producer, mixing
 Deidre Graham – marketing
 Terry "Murda Mac" Herbert – assistant engineer
 Bashiri Johnson – percussion
 Gavin "YG" Johnston – assistant engineer
 Terese Joseph – A&R
 Jimi Kendrix – producer
 Darcell Lawrence – production executive
 Trevor Lawrence – drums

 Selan Lerner – keyboards
 Jerome Leventhal – management
 Chris "Gotti" Lorenzo – A&R
 Tammy Lucas – background vocals
 Deborah Mannis-Gardner – sample clearance
 Glen "It's Crazy" Markazi – engineer, mixing
 Josh McDonnell – assistant engineer
 Demetrius McGhee – organ, strings, bass guitar, keyboards, producer, instrumentation
 Rosie Michel – stylist
 Fred Moore – A&R
 Karen Moskowitz – photography
 Rick Patrick – creative director
 Tenisha Ramos – marketing
 Bill Sample – Hammond organ
 Chink Santana – producer
 Adam Scheurmann – engineer, assistant engineer
 Paul Silveira – engineer
 Todd "Shortma" Simms – A&R
 Quinshae Snead – personal assistant
 Rob Stefanson – assistant engineer
 Supa Engineer "Dura" – mixing
 Laura Tamburino – art producer
 Errol "Breezie" Jr. Vaughn – A&R
 Andy West – art direction

Charts

Weekly charts

Year-end charts

Certifications

References

External links

2004 albums
Albums produced by Chink Santana
Albums with cover art by Tony Duran
Ashanti (singer) albums
Def Jam Recordings albums